Sir Christopher Wandesford (1592–1640) was MP for Aldborough, Richmond and Thirsk and Lord Deputy of Ireland, 1640.

Christopher Wandesford  may also refer to:

Sir Christopher Wandesford, 1st Baronet (1628–1687), of the Wandesford Baronets
Christopher Wandesford, 1st Viscount Castlecomer (1656–1707), Viscount Castlecomer
Christopher Wandesford, 2nd Viscount Castlecomer (1684–1719)
Christopher Wandesford, 3rd Viscount Castlecomer (1717–1736), Viscount Castlecomer